The 1924 Sewanee Tigers football team represented the Sewanee Tigers of Sewanee: The University of the South during the 1924 Southern Conference football season. It was the team's first season in the Southern Conference, and features its last victory over rival Vanderbilt. Sewanee was also a co-member of the Southern Intercollegiate Athletic Association in 1924, its last season as a member. The game against Carson-Newman was forfeited in their favor.

Schedule

References

Sewanee
Sewanee Tigers football seasons
Sewanee Tigers football